The Kemptown Tournament was a late Victorian period combined men's and women's grass court tennis tournament held only one time in June 1880, at Kemptown, Brighton, East Sussex, England.

History
The Kemptown Tournament was a Victorian era grass court tennis tournament staged only one time from 14 to 21 June 1880. The tournament featured both a men's and women's singles events. The gentleman's singles was won by Sir Arthur Oldham Jennings who defeated Sir Thomas Jenner Verrall, and the ladie's singles was won by  Miss Adshead who defeated Eva Adshead 6–1, 4–6, 3–6, 6–2, 6–3, this match was unusual in that it featured a five set match.

References

Defunct tennis tournaments in the United Kingdom
Grass court tennis tournaments